Sypharochiton sinclairi is a species of chiton in the family Chitonidae.

Distribution
New Zealand

References

Chitonidae
Chitons described in 1843
Taxa named by John Edward Gray
Endemic fauna of New Zealand
Endemic molluscs of New Zealand